Li Chengjiang (born April 28, 1979) is a Chinese former competitive figure skater. He is the 2001 Four Continents champion, the 2004 Grand Prix Final bronze medalist, and a six-time Chinese national champion. Li placed as high as fourth at the World Championships (2003) and competed twice at the Winter Olympics. He retired from competition in 2009 and became a coach in Beijing, working with Zhao Ziquan among others.

Programs

Competitive highlights
GP: Grand Prix; JGP: Junior Grand Prix

References

External links

 

1979 births
Living people
Chinese male single skaters
Figure skaters at the 2002 Winter Olympics
Figure skaters at the 2006 Winter Olympics
Olympic figure skaters of China
Figure skaters from Changchun
Four Continents Figure Skating Championships medalists
Asian Games medalists in figure skating
Figure skaters at the 1999 Asian Winter Games
Figure skaters at the 2003 Asian Winter Games
Figure skaters at the 2007 Asian Winter Games
Medalists at the 1999 Asian Winter Games
Medalists at the 2003 Asian Winter Games
Medalists at the 2007 Asian Winter Games
Asian Games gold medalists for China
Asian Games silver medalists for China
Competitors at the 1997 Winter Universiade